Sibo is a locality situated in Bollnäs Municipality, Gävleborg County, Sweden with 281 inhabitants in 2015.

Demographics

References 

Populated places in Bollnäs Municipality
Hälsingland